Upendra is an Indian film actor and director known primarily for his work in Kannada cinema. He began his career writing dialogues and lyrics for soundtrack in Kannada films. He then started out as a director making his debut in 1992 with Tharle Nan Maga. In a career spanning over 25 years, he has directed 10 films and acted in over 60 films.

Filmography

As actor

As director and writer

Discography

Notes

References

External links
 

Indian filmographies
Male actor filmographies
Director filmographies
Discographies of Indian artists